CD177 antigen is a protein that in humans is encoded by the CD177 gene.

NB1, a glycosyl-phosphatidylinositol (GPI)-linked N-glycosylated cell surface glycoprotein, was first described in a case of neonatal alloimmune neutropenia (Lalezari et al., 1971). [supplied by OMIM]

See also
 Cluster of differentiation

References

Further reading

External links
 
 

Clusters of differentiation